Pierre Michel Armand François Lorin (25 October 1912 – 16 March 1970) was a French ice hockey player. He competed in the men's tournament at the 1936 Winter Olympics.

References

1912 births
1970 deaths
Ice hockey players at the 1936 Winter Olympics
Olympic ice hockey players of France